KLIZ may refer to:

 KLIZ (AM), a radio station (1380 AM) licensed to Brainerd, Minnesota, United States
 KLIZ-FM, a radio station (107.5 FM) licensed to Brainerd, Minnesota, United States
 ICAO code of Loring Air Force Base
 Old High German equivalent of Glitnir